Thomas Dugdale may refer to:

 Thomas Dugdale, 1st Baron Crathorne (1897–1977), British Conservative Party politician
 Thomas Cantrell Dugdale (1880–1952), British artist
 PS Thomas Dugdale (1873), a paddle steamer passenger vessel

Dugdale, Thomas